Grêmio Esportivo Jaciara, usually known simply as Jaciara is a Brazilian football club from Jaciara, Mato Grosso state.

History
On June 15, 1975, the club was founded.

In 2007, Jaciara finished as Mato Grosso State Championship's runner-up, thus being allowed to compete in the same year's Brazilian Championship Third Level.

Stadium
Jaciara's stadium is Estádio Municipal Márcio Cassiano da Silva, with has a maximum capacity of 5,000 people.

References

External links
 Grêmio Esportivo Jaciara at Arquivo de Clubes

Association football clubs established in 1975
Football clubs in Mato Grosso
1975 establishments in Brazil